Notre Dame College, Mymensingh, is a Catholic higher secondary school in Mymensingh, Bangladesh. It was founded on 1 July 2014, and is named after Mother Mary.

The college's motto "Love The Light of Wisdom", or "Deligite Lumen Sapientiae".

The college's slogan," Seek knowledge to serve humanity".

History
Notre Dame College, Mymensingh was established by the Roman Catholic Priests from the Congregation of Holy Cross in Mymensingh in 2014. The construction work started on March 1, 2013; after the cornerstone was laid. Classes for the eleventh grade started shortly on July 1, 2014. It was officially inaugurated on January 11, 2015.

References

External links
 

2014 establishments in Bangladesh
Colleges in Mymensingh District
Private colleges in Bangladesh
Educational institutions established in 2014